The license plates of Mauritania have a blue label on white background. The signs begin with four digits followed by two letters and a two digit number, which gives information about the area in which the vehicle is registered (for example, 00 for Nouakchott). On the right side show Mauritanian license plates based on the Euro plate a blue bar. This shows a circle rimmed country outline, and the distinguishing sign of RIM (French : République Islamique de Mauritanie - Islamic Republic of Mauritania) in Arabic and Latin letters. In older signs missing the bar and there appear only the letters.

Regional coding

00 - Nouakchott
01 - Al Hudd Al-Sharq
02 - Al Hudd Al Gharbi
03 - Al Aasaba
04 - Kulak
05 - Al Brakna
06 - Al Trarza
07 - Adrar
08 - Dakhla Nuazibu
09 - Takant
10 - Hidimaha
11 - Tiris Zimur
12 - Inshyri

External links
MAURITANIA FRANCOPLAQUE
Plateshack Mauritania

Mauritania